Buckles and Boots is the second studio album by Canadian country-rock artist Ridley Bent. The album was released on November 27, 2007 by Open Road Recordings. Its first single, "Heartland Heartbreak," reached the Top 30 on the Canadian Country Singles chart.

Track listing
"Slim Chance" - 0:32
rodeo intro
"Buckles and Boots" (Ridley Bent) - 4:10
"Nine Inch Nails" (Bent, Dustin Bentall) - 3:56
"Cry" (Bent, Bentall, Cameron Latimer) - 4:01
"Heartland Heartbreak" (Bent) - 4:33
"Arlington" (Bent, Karly Warkentin) - 4:40
"Stand in Line" (Bent) - 3:12
"Bobby and Suzanne" (Bent) - 4:29
"Faded Red Hoodie" (Bent) - 3:56
"Mama" (Bent) - 5:06
"Apache Hairlifter" (Bent, Adam Dobres, Latimer) - 8:34

References
Allmusic (see infobox)

2007 albums
Ridley Bent albums
Open Road Recordings albums